The Malyangaapa are an Indigenous Australian Tribe of people who live in the far western areas of the state of New South Wales.

Language
The Malyangapa spoke a dialect of the Yarli language.

Country
To the east their tribal boundaries ran to beyond Mount Arrowsmith. The southern boundaries lay around Mutawintji and Sturt Meadow.

Culture
The Malyangapa practiced circumcision as a rite for males undergoing initiation. In their dreaming lore the primordial creator-figure, rainbow serpent was called kakurra (corresponding to the Ngatyi of the Paakantyi and the akurra of their western neighbours, the Adnyamathanha. They shared close cultural and marriage links with the neighbouring Wanjiwalku.

History of contact
Reid states that settlement of Malyangapa lands began in 1862/1863, at which time they were thought to number 200. Within the decade this figure dropped by a quarter (150), and after 15 years of contact (1879), Reid estimated only roughly 60 had survived, half of whom were under fourteen. Among these was a remnant of the Ngurunta

Alternative names
 Maljangaba
 Malya-napa, Mulya-napa, Mulya-nappa
 Milya-uppa
 Mullia-arpa, Muliaarpa
 Malynapa, Malja:pa, Malyapa
 Maljangaba
 Nalyanapa. (perhaps a misprint)
 Malgangara
 Karikari. (kari means yes)
 Bulalli, Bulali (meaning 'hill people')

Some words
 talda. (kangaroo)
 koonoo. (tame dog)
 urlka. (wild dog)
 koomarde. (father)
 armunde.(mother)
 tootoo. (whiteman)
 bula (hill)
 kari (yes).
 wii (fire/firewood)
 kalithi (emu)

Notes

Citations

Sources

Aboriginal peoples of New South Wales